Atal II is a mountain of the Garhwal Himalaya in Uttarakhand India. Earlier it was known as P.6557. It was renamed after a team from the N.I.M Nehru Institute of Mountaineering climbed four unnamed peaks and named it after former Prime Minister Atal Bihari Vajpayee, according to Colonel Amit Bisht, principal of the N.I.M. The peak lies above the Shyamvarn Glacier. It is joint 74th highest located entirely within the Uttrakhand. Nanda Devi is the highest mountain in this category. It lies 6 km ENE of Sudarshan Parbat . Swetvarn  lies 5.1 km WSW and it is 5.5 km east of Chaturbhuj . It lies 2.9 km ESE of Yogeshwar .

Climbing history
Atal II was climbed by Nehru Institute of Mountaineering led by Colonel Amit Bisht, principal N.I.M.in October 2018. The expedition was flagged off from Dehradun on October 4 by Chief Minister Trivendra Singh Rawat. The expedition was jointly conducted by N.I.M. and the tourism department of Uttarakhand.

Neighboring and subsidiary peaks
Neighboring or subsidiary peaks of Atal II:
 Shyamvarn 
 Sudarshan Parbat 
 Yogeshwar 
 Chaturbhuj  
 Matri 
 Swetvarn 
 Kalidhang

Glaciers and rivers

Shyamvarn bamak on the western side. Nilamber Glacier on the eastern side both these Glaciers are tributaries of Raktvarn Bamak which drain itself at Gangotri Glacier. From the snout of Gangotri Glacier which was called Gomukh emerges Bhagirathi river. one of the main tributaries of river Ganga that later joins Alaknanda River the other main tributaries of river Ganga at Devprayag and became Ganga there after.

See also

 List of Himalayan peaks of Uttarakhand

References

Mountains of Uttarakhand
Six-thousanders of the Himalayas
Geography of Chamoli district